Fred E. Soper (February 21, 1854 – June 18, 1930) was an American farmer, livestock dealer, and politician.

Soper was born in the town of Brooklyn, Green Lake County, Wisconsin. He moved with his parents to a farm near Ripon, Wisconsin. Soper then bought his own farm and raised livestock. In 1907, Soper served in the Wisconsin State Assembly; he was a Republican. Soper died of a heart attack in Ripon, Wisconsin.

External links

References

1854 births
1930 deaths
People from Ripon, Wisconsin
People from Green Lake County, Wisconsin
Farmers from Wisconsin
Republican Party members of the Wisconsin State Assembly